The A-Files: Alien Songs is a 1998 music album by Alvin and the Chipmunks, released by Sony Wonder. The album's concept parodied the Fox TV series The X-Files.

Track listing
 "The Purple People Eater" (Sheb Wooley; originally performed by Sheb Wooley) - The Chipmunks – 3:35
 "Men in Black" (Will Smith/Patrice Rushen/Terri McFadden/Freddie Washington; originally performed by Will Smith and featured in the 1997 film of the same name) - The Chipmunks – 3:46
 "X-Files Theme" (Mark Snow; originally featured in the television series The X-Files) - Alvin and Brittany – 3:06
 "Rocket Man" (Elton John/Bernie Taupin; originally performed by Elton John) - The Chipmunks – 3:36
 "Venus" (Robbie van Leeuwen; originally performed by Shocking Blue) - The Chipettes – 3:33
 "The Time Warp" (Richard O'Brien/Richard Hartley; originally featured in the 1973 musical The Rocky Horror Show and its 1975 film adaptation) - The Chipmunks and The Chipettes – 3:41
 "People Are Strange" (Jim Morrison/Robby Krieger; originally performed by The Doors) - The Chipmunks – 3:23
 "Star Wars: Cantina Band" (John Williams; originally featured in the 1977 film Star Wars) - The Chipmunks – 2:44
 "Mr. Spaceman" (Jim McGuinn; originally performed by The Byrds) - The Chipmunks – 2:56
 "Destination Unknown" (Dale Bozzio/Terry Bozzio/Warren Cuccurullo; originally performed by Missing Persons) - The Chipettes – 3:32

Sources: Amazon AllMusic

References

1998 albums
Alvin and the Chipmunks albums
Columbia Records albums